Arctesthes is a genus of moths in the family Geometridae described by Edward Meyrick in 1885. It is endemic to New Zealand.

Species
 Arctesthes avatar Patrick, Patrick & Hoare, 2019
 Arctesthes catapyrrha (Butler, 1877)
 Arctesthes siris (Hudson, 1908)
 Arctesthes titanica Patrick, Patrick & Hoare, 2019

References

Larentiinae
Endemic fauna of New Zealand
Geometridae genera
Endemic moths of New Zealand